Raha is a small town in Nagaon district of Assam, India, situated near the National Highway 37. The river Kolong and Kopili flows near Raha. Raha is also situated near to Chaparmukh, a small town popularly known for Chaparmukh junction, one of the prominent railway stations in Nagaon district.

Education

School
 Raha Higher Secondary School
 Raha Girls High School
 Raha Adarsha Sarkari Nimna Buniyadi Abhyaxon Vidyalaya.
 Pranjal Memorial Academy
 Raha Adarsha Shishu Bikash Kendra
 Pandit Gopinath Bordoloi High School
Sankardev Sishu Vidya Niketan Raha.
St. Basil's Academy, Chaparmukh.

Junior College
Raha Resonance Junior College

College
 Raha College
 College of Fisheries Science

Politics
Raha is part of Nowgong (Lok Sabha constituency).
Present MLA of Raha Vidhan Sabha constituency is Sashi Kanta Das from Congress.

Notable person
 Gopinath Bordoloi, first chief minister of Assam. He was born in Raha. His house which is in the middle of the Raha wholesale market, inside the Government Circuit house compound have been converted to a museum. This museum have his personal items, cloths, letters to and from notable politicians of his age, like M K Gandhi etc. This museum which is maintained by the government of Assam, is open to the visitors on all days except holidays.
 Banwari Lal Hansaria, former judge of the Supreme Court of India, hails from Raha.
 Abdul Kadir, former FCI Employee of the Nagaon FCI District Office, hails from Raha Monipurtup Bazaar and he is founder of Barsha Rice Mill Monipurtup,at present his son Mukut Ali Hazarika is the owner of the Barsha Rice Mill which is established in the year 2015.Abdul Kadir he is popularly known as FCI Kadir at his village.Everyone knows his very well.

Villages in Nagaon district